Parkhall Integrated College is an integrated co-educational non-selective secondary school in Antrim, County Antrim, Northern Ireland. There are 1,100 students aged between 11 and 18, that is in Year 8 to Year 14.

Context
Integrated Education is a Northern Ireland phenomenon, where traditionally schools were sectarian, either run as Catholic schools or Protestant schools. On as parental request, a school could apply to 'transition' to become Grant Maintained offering 30% of the school places to students from the minority community. Lagan College was the first integrated school to open in 1981.

Facilities
The college re-located from two sites to a single modern facility in 2018. There is a wide range of indoor and outdoor sporting facilities. There is also a youth and community wing.

Activities
In the 2012 London Olympics torch relay the Principal's secretary carried the torch through Antrim.

See also
 List of integrated schools in Northern Ireland
 List of secondary schools in Northern Ireland
 Education in Northern Ireland

References

External links
Official college website
NICIE website

Secondary schools in County Antrim
Integrated schools in County Antrim
Antrim, County Antrim